Carl Lee (born Carl Vincent Canegata; November 22, 1926 – April 17, 1986) was an American actor. His father was actor/professional boxer Canada Lee.

Biography
Lee, billed as Canada Lee Jr at age 16, played a student at Tuskegee Institute in an April 1952 episode of American Inventory. His father starred in the episode as George Washington Carver. Lee made his first film appearance in Human Desire (1954). Lee played a heroin dealer, the central role in the Obie Award-winning play The Connection. He appeared in the film version released in 1961.

Lee appeared in films such as A Man Called Adam (1966) opposite Sammy Davis, Jr. and Cicely Tyson, and the blaxploitation film Superfly (with Ron O'Neal, 1972). He also appeared on television in such shows as The Defenders, Mannix, and Good Times ("Willona's Surprise", 1977) in which he portrayed Willona Woods' ex-husband Ray, who makes sexual advances towards the character Thelma Evans.

While filming The Connection, Lee fell in love with its director, Shirley Clarke. Their relationship lasted almost 30 years until Lee's death.

Lee suffered a heroin addiction that caused him to contract AIDS from a dirty hypodermic needle. He died from a heroin overdose in 1986. In a 2000 interview, filmmaker James Toback stated "In the sort of hip world of New York, Carl Lee was the hip-black-actor icon. He was for hip people what Sidney Poitier was for mainstream people."

Acting filmography
Films
 Human Desire (1954) as John Thurston (uncredited)
 The Connection (1961) as Cowboy
 The Cool World (1964) as Priest
 A Man Called Adam (1966)
 Portrait of Jason (1967, off-screen voice)
 The Landlord (1970) as Carl
 Pound (1970) as Thief
 Werewolves on Wheels (1971)
 Super Fly (1972) as Eddie
 Gordon's War (1973) as Bee Bishop
 Exposed (1983) as Duke

Television
 The Nurses (1963) as Lonnie Hill
 The Defenders (1965) as Philip Dunning
 Caribe (1975) as Haines
 Mannix (1975) as Ginger
 Barbary Coast (1975) as Currier
 Serpico (1976) as Carothers
 Good Times (1977) as Ray Woods
 Keeping On (1981) as Davis

References

External links
 
 Actor Carl Lee reference at LA Broadway World.com site (archived 2011)

1926 births
1986 deaths
American people of West Indian descent
African-American male actors
American male film actors
American male television actors
Male actors from New York City
20th-century American male actors
People with HIV/AIDS
Deaths by heroin overdose in New York (state)
Drug-related deaths in New York City
20th-century African-American people